Once Around is a 1991 American romantic comedy-drama film about a young woman who falls for and eventually marries an overbearing older man who proceeds to rub her close-knit family the wrong way, while exposing the dynamics of other family members along the way. It stars Richard Dreyfuss, Holly Hunter, Danny Aiello, Laura San Giacomo and Gena Rowlands and was written by Malia Scotch Marmo and directed by Swedish director Lasse Hallström, in his full English-language film debut.

Plot
The Bellas are a close-knit family of Italian-Americans living in Boston, Massachusetts. Joe, the head of the family, owns a construction company. He has been married to Marilyn for 34 years and they have three children—Renata, Tony and Jan. Jan (the youngest) is about to get married, leading introverted Renata (the eldest and only one not married) to wonder why her boyfriend Rob has not yet proposed to her. Once Rob reveals that he never plans on marrying her, she leaves him and moves back in with her parents.

Renata travels to the Caribbean, where she takes a course on selling condominiums. She meets Sam Sharpe, a highly successful Lithuanian-American salesman who makes a speech at a training seminar. They are instantly attracted to each other, and Sam accompanies her back to Boston, where Renata introduces him to her family. The chain-smoking, abrasive Sam is overly eager to please. While the majority of the Bellas give Sam a chance, Jan seems to have a particular dislike of him. This upsets Renata and the siblings' rapport becomes strained. Jan eventually apologizes and gives Renata her blessing.

Sam and Renata get married, with Sam relocating his business from New York to Boston so he can spend as much time with Renata as possible. At a memorial for Joe's late mother, Sam attempts to sing a song in her honor, but the Bellas, especially Marilyn, tell him it is highly inappropriate. Renata tells Sam he is tearing her family apart. They reconcile, and the next day Renata gives birth to their daughter. At the baptism, Sam suffers a heart attack and is rushed to the hospital.

Now in a wheelchair, Sam is welcomed home to the Bella residence to celebrate Christmas as a family. During dinner, he lights up a cigarette, which an irritated Renata throws into a glass of wine. On a frozen lake, Renata goes skating, while Sam and their daughter watch from a distance. Sam passes away while still holding his child. After the funeral, Renata mourns, but is grateful for the time they had together and for Sam changing her life for the better. Joe directs the funeral procession through several rotations on a traffic round-about, something Sam learned from his father-in-law and greatly enjoyed during his life.

Cast
 Richard Dreyfuss as Sam Sharpe
 Holly Hunter as Renata Bella
 Danny Aiello as Joe Bella
 Laura San Giacomo as Jan Bella
 Gena Rowlands as Marilyn Bella
 Roxanne Hart as Gail Bella
 Danton Stone as Tony Bella
 Tim Guinee as Peter Hedges
 Greg Germann as Jim Redstone
 Griffin Dunne as Rob
 Cullen O. Johnson as Sonny
 Glenn Russell Turk as Wedding Band Drummer

Soundtrack
James Horner wrote the musical score for this film. The film features "Fly Me to the Moon" as its main song.

Reception
The movie gained mixed-to-positive reviews from critics. The film holds a 67% "Fresh" score on Rotten Tomatoes based on 21 critics.

Several details of Lithuanian-American culture are present in the film, such as the folk dance in the wedding party, the folksong about motherhood, and the priest performing the baptism of the newborn child.

References

External links 
 
 
 
 

1991 films
1990s romantic comedy-drama films
American romantic comedy-drama films
Films scored by James Horner
Films about families
Films directed by Lasse Hallström
Films set in Boston
Films shot in Massachusetts
Films shot in North Carolina
Universal Pictures films
Films shot in New Hampshire
Films about Italian-American culture
Films about Lithuanian-American culture
1990s English-language films
1990s American films